Edge & Christian (E&C) were a Canadian professional wrestling tag team. They are best known for their time in the World Wrestling Federation (WWF), later renamed World Wrestling Entertainment (WWE) where they won the WWF Tag Team Championship on seven occasions. Initially, the two were portrayed as on-screen brothers, but the aspect was de-emphasized in the mid-2000s, and in 2010, the team was officially retconned as childhood friends. The team disbanded in 2001 but reunited briefly on the SmackDown brand in 2011. Edge, however, announced his retirement from professional wrestling due to neck injury on the April 11 episode of Monday Night Raw, which would ultimately end their final run together. Edge made his in-ring return in 2020, followed by Christian in 2021, as the two were both entrants in the 2021 Royal Rumble. Shortly after, Christian would leave WWE for AEW.

In addition to their seven reigns as WWF Tag Team Champions, they each won singles titles during their run as a tag team. Edge and Christian are also noteworthy for their participation in the first three Tables, Ladders, and Chairs matches (TLC matches). They are considered one of the major teams that revived tag team wrestling during the Attitude Era. In 2012, WWE named them the greatest tag team in WWE history. The team's popularity propelled Edge & Christian to main event success, with both men becoming multiple-time world champions in their own right.

History

Independent circuit (1997–1998)
Copeland & Reso formed a tag team in the Canadian independent circuit after completing their training with Ron Hutchison and Sweet Daddy Siki at Hutchinson's "Sully's Gym". The pair primarily used the ring names of Sexton Hardcastle & Christian Cage, respectively. Their tag team wrestled under several team names, such as "High Impact", "Suicide Blondes", "Revolution X", "Hard Impact" and "Canadian Rockers". They were part of a faction dubbed "Thug LiFe" in 1997. The stable consisted of Cage, Hardcastle, Joe E. Legend, Rhino Richards, Bloody Bill Skullion, Big Daddy Adams, and Martin Kane. In 1998, Sexton and Christian began teaming up in independent promotions such as Insane Championship Wrestling (ICW) and Southern States Wrestling (SSW).

The duo won the ICW Streetfight Tag Team Championship twice and SSW Tag Team Championship once during their time in the independent circuit.

World Wrestling Federation/Entertainment (1998–2001; 2009–2011)

The Brood and Terri Invitational Tournament (1998-2000)
On the June 22, 1998 episode of Raw is War, Copeland debuted as Edge in the World Wrestling Federation (WWF) against Jose Estrada Jr. He was a mysterious "loner" character, who would emerge from the crowd before his matches. Eventually, he started a feud with Gangrel. At In Your House: Breakdown, during a match pitting Edge against Owen Hart, Reso, cited as an unknown person looking similar to Edge, came out to the ring distracting him enough to allow Hart to get the win. It was later revealed that Reso's character was Christian, Edge's storyline brother, and he was aligned with Gangrel as his vampire follower. After some confrontations between the two gothic brothers, Edge was convinced to 'come home' with Christian & Gangrel, and the three of them formed a stable known as "The Brood".

At In Your House: Rock Bottom, the Brood defeated The J.O.B. Squad (Al Snow, Bob Holly, & Scorpio). The Brood briefly joined The Undertaker's Ministry of Darkness faction, but left after Christian was flogged and almost sacrificed for revealing Stephanie McMahon's whereabouts to Ken Shamrock. Following a short feud with the Ministry, Gangrel turned on Edge and demanded that Christian do the same. He refused and both he and Edge broke with Gangrel turning them into fan favorites. From there, the gothic storyline enjoyed limited success, beginning their eventual tag team feud with The Hardy Boyz (Matt Hardy & Jeff Hardy), who also briefly formed a new Brood with Gangrel before turning on him as well. At this point, the duo had rehashed Edge's pre-Brood gimmick as borderline gothic fan favorites most notable for a tendency to enter the ring through the audience.

The tag team feud with the Hardy Boyz intensified as Gangrel became Matt & Jeff's new manager, combining to form "The New Brood", in the summer of 1999. However, both teams were more interested in acquiring the managerial services of Terri Runnels for which (along with $100,000) they would compete in a best-of-five series of matches known as the Terri Invitational Tournament. Edge & Christian won the first two matches, putting the Hardyz in sudden jeopardy. The Hardyz went on to win the next two matches, however, leading to a rubber match at No Mercy to determine which team would earn Terri's services. The rubber match would be a ladder match, in which Gangrel tried to interfere, only to get ejected. Matt & Jeff Hardy went on to win the match and the Terri Invitational Tournament after a competitive bout that resulted in both teams receiving a standing ovation after the match as well as the next night on Raw is War. On that next night, the four men shook hands in a show of respect, then all turned against Gangrel by attacking him when he came out to boast about spending the night with Terri, establishing them as heroic figures and removing Gangrel from the equation.

The storyline then focused around the "mutual respect" between Edge & Christian and the Hardy Boyz, along with both teams' pursuit of the WWF Tag Team Championship. The two teams were involved in several matches together, such as at Survivor Series and No Way Out. However, shortly after Terri betrayed the Hardyz at No Way Out, the truce between the two teams imploded and they began fighting each other once more. Terri then attempted to sow discord between Edge & Christian in a storyline that was originally intended to see the two split off into singles wrestlers with Terri managing Christian, but was soon changed to keep the tag team together and have them reject Terri's plans.

Comedic antics and championship pursuits (2000)

Edge & Christian continued their "mutual respect" storyline with the Hardy Boyz,  At WrestleMania 2000, they defeated the defending champion Dudley Boyz (Bubba Ray Dudley & D-Von Dudley) and the Hardy Boyz in a Triangle ladder match for their first WWF Tag Team Championship. Immediately thereafter, Edge & Christian redefined themselves as a villainous duo of comedic surfer-styled teen idols. No longer entering the arena through the crowd, the two engaged in various antics including making fun of their opponents or the city they were performing in, using strange exclusive phrases (the most notable being "reek of awesomeness"), and dressing in outlandish costumes. Other trademarks of theirs included the "five-second pose" where, "for the benefit of those with flash photography", they would stand still in odd positions in the middle of the ring so fans could take pictures. These poses usually involved making fun of either their opponents or aspects of town pride (for instance, making fun of Elvis Presley during a show in Memphis, Tennessee or imitating Bill Buckner in the 1986 World Series at an event in Boston) to generate a negative reaction from the crowd.

At Backlash, the duo retained their titles against D-Generation X (X-Pac & Road Dogg). They began a feud with Too Cool (Scotty 2 Hotty, Grand Master Sexay, & Rikishi). On May 29, 2000 edition of Raw is War, they dropped the titles to Scotty & Sexay. At the King of the Ring pay-per-view, the duo defeated Too Cool, Hardy Boyz, and T & A (Test & Albert) in a Four Corners elimination match to win their second WWF Tag Team Championship.

Matching the Dudleyz' penchant for driving enemies through tables and the Hardyz' proficiency in diving attacks using ladders, Edge & Christian became known for using the "con-chair-to", an attack consisting of simultaneous steel chair shots on both sides of a victim's head. At SummerSlam, they defended their titles successfully against the Dudleyz and Hardyz in the first-ever Tables, Ladders and Chairs match (TLC match), a specialized ladder match themed around the signature weapons of all three teams. Edge & Christian stated that instead of doing the "time-honored tradition" of shaking the hands of their opponents, they would instead do the time-honored tradition of mocking their opponents, and had four little people show up dressed as the Hardy Boyz and the Dudley Boyz, with toy ladders and tables, with a "37-second pose" when the fake Hardys and Dudleys bowed to Edge & Christian, who stood on the table.

Los Conquistadores (2000)
After Edge & Christian lost the tag team championship to the Hardy Boyz at Unforgiven, they had a rematch on the September 25 edition of Raw is War in a ladder match which they lost. According to the pre-match stipulation, they could never again challenge for the tag team championship as long as the Hardy Boyz held them. Thus, they began competing under the masks of Los Conquistadores. On the October 16 edition of Raw Is War, they defeated Dudley Boyz, and on the October 19 edition of SmackDown!, they won a tag team battle royal to earn themselves a tag team title shot. They went on to defeat the Hardy Boyz at No Mercy to once again become the tag team champions .

Soon after, another team began competing as Los Conquistadores as well, and they soon challenged Edge & Christian for their tag team championship on the October 23 episode of Raw is War. "Los Conquistadores" defeated Edge & Christian before ripping off their masks and revealing themselves as the Hardy Boyz.

Team RECK (2000–2001)
They eventually started to team with Kurt Angle, forming "Team ECK", a group that was later joined by Rhyno when he came in from Extreme Championship Wrestling in early 2001 to make "Team RECK".

At Armageddon, Edge & Christian competed in a Four Corners match which included the champions, Right to Censor (The Goodfather & Bull Buchanan), Dudley Boyz and the makeshift team of Road Dogg & K-Kwik. Edge & Christian went on to win the match and their fourth WWF Tag Team Championship. A week later, they lost the WWF Tag Team Championship to The Rock & The Undertaker but eventually regained them.

At the Royal Rumble, they lost the titles to the Dudley Boyz. They aided the Hardy Boyz in defeating the Dudley Boyz for the titles on March 5, 2001 edition of Raw is War and then two weeks later, they defeated the Hardy Boyz themselves for their record breaking sixth WWF Tag Team Championship. Later that night, they dropped the titles to the Dudley Boyz making them the shortest reigning WWF Tag Team Champions of all time. At WrestleMania X-Seven, they defeated the then-champions the Dudley Boyz and the Hardy Boyz in the second TLC match for their seventh and final WWF Tag Team Championship, but with help from their teammate Rhyno. On the April 19 episode of SmackDown!, they lost the WWF Tag Team Championship to The Brothers of Destruction (Undertaker & Kane).

Split, brief reunions, and individual success
Friction arose between the team (as well as the entire RECK faction) at King of the Ring when Edge won the 2001 King of the Ring tournament (all four members had made it to the semi-finals). As a result, on the September 3 edition of Raw is War in their hometown of Toronto, Christian appeared to be jealous of his brother and insisted on carrying Edge's trophy to the ring. During the night, he assaulted Edge with a "one-man con-chair-to" turning into a major heel and joined The Alliance. The former partners went on to feud over the WWF Intercontinental Championship for several months, causing the team to split.

Edge & Christian had a one-night reunion at a SmackDown! live event on October 13, 2002 when they defeated Los Guerreros (Eddie & Chavo). They reunited again on November 15, 2004 edition of Raw but ended up losing to Chris Benoit & Shelton Benjamin. From there, they would become loosely united through Christian facing Edge's storyline rivals, leading to three more reunion tag team matches in 2005. These reunions, officially or otherwise, also included a brand new third party in the form of Christian's acting problem solver at the time, Tyson Tomko.

Christian left WWE on November 13, 2005. He debuted in Total Nonstop Action Wrestling (TNA) at its Genesis pay-per-view under the ring name Christian Cage, which he used in Canadian independent circuit. Christian experienced immediate success in TNA, where he won the NWA World Heavyweight Championship twice. Edge also achieved greater success in WWE after Christian's departure. He went on to win (Before Christian departed) the first-ever Money in the Bank ladder match at WrestleMania 21 and cashed in his Money in the Bank contract at New Year's Revolution and won the WWE Championship, his first of eleven world championship reigns.

Reunion and Edge's retirement (2009–2012)
In 2009, Christian returned to WWE, and at Backlash, won the ECW Championship, his first world championship in WWE. Following his title win, and before Edge's ninth world title win that same night, the duo interacted on television for the first time since Christian's return, with Christian criticizing Edge for not being "fun" anymore. On the first SmackDown following the 2010 WWE Draft, Christian and Edge came face-to-face following Edge's goodbye speech, in which they referred to themselves simply as childhood friends rather than brothers. Christian would force Edge to reveal that he had manipulated the fans, challenging Edge to a match. Edge refused, leading to a brawl between the two, in which Christian got the upper hand. On Raw May 17, in their hometown of Toronto, Edge was scheduled for a "Pick Your Poison" match and his opponent turned out to be Christian. Edge eventually won the match with a spear, however, moments later Randy Orton revealed that The Undertaker was in fact his real opponent. Though Edge got himself intentionally counted out, Christian got the last laugh by throwing Edge back into the ring to get chokeslammed by the Undertaker.

They reunited once again at the 2010 Slammy Awards, with Edge as a face again and on better terms. They presented the award for meltdown of the year, which was ironically won by Edge for destroying the laptop where the Anonymous Raw General Manager sent his messages to. At the 2011 Royal Rumble, Edge paid homage to Christian when he applied a Killswitch to Dolph Ziggler and retained the World Heavyweight Championship. Christian returned at Elimination Chamber and came to the aid of Edge when he was being attacked by Alberto Del Rio right after his match. At the March 4 tapings of SmackDown, Christian saved Edge from Del Rio and Ricardo Rodriguez. The following week, Christian once again saved Edge from Del Rio and his NXT rookie, Brodus Clay. The duo was beaten down, however, which resulted in Theodore Long setting up a tag team match as the main event. Later that night, Edge and Christian officially reunited when they defeated Del Rio and Clay. A week later, Edge defeated Clay in a one-on-one match. Del Rio attacked Edge afterward but was stopped by Christian. The duo brawled until Long announced a steel cage match as the main event in which Christian defeated Del Rio. Afterward, Edge attempted to destroy Del Rio's Bentley. He was stopped though and given a con-chair-to. The following week, Long announced that if Edge or Del Rio touched each other before WrestleMania XXVII, they would both be banned from it. The main event saw Christian face Del Rio once again. Christian won but Edge, who had accompanied him, nearly hit Del Rio with a chair. Christian stopped him though and hit Del Rio himself. On next week's episode of Raw, the duo once again faced Del Rio and Clay. They defeated them but afterward, Del Rio applied the cross armbreaker to Christian. Edge chased him off but was then attacked from behind by Del Rio.

At WrestleMania, Edge defeated Del Rio. Afterward, with Christian's help, he destroyed Del Rio's car. On the following SmackDown, Del Rio expressed his anger towards Edge & Christian and promised to make them pay. Edge came out with the car he destroyed at WrestleMania to taunt him. Del Rio demanded a rematch but Edge said others deserved it more, like Christian who exited the towing truck. Before any fight erupted, Long scheduled a match between Christian and Del Rio to determine the number-one contender that would face Edge in a ladder match for the title at Extreme Rules. Del Rio defeated Christian after he got distracted by Edge spearing Brodus Clay.

On the April 15, 2011 edition of Raw, Edge announced his retirement from professional wrestling due to injury, vacating the World Heavyweight Championship in the process. Upon his retirement, Christian would gain a championship match for the vacated World Heavyweight Championship against Del Rio after winning a 20-Man Battle Royal. At Extreme Rules, after a distraction by Edge reversed the effects of interference from Clay, Christian defeated Del Rio for the vacated title. Edge & Christian celebrated the win and embraced in the ring one final time.

At SummerSlam, Christian revealed that Edge would be at ringside for his match against Randy Orton. However, Edge berated Christian for his recent actions and left him to fight in a losing effort to Orton. On the September 16, 2011 edition of SmackDown, entitled 'Edge Appreciation Night', the duo once again came face to face backstage. They made up but argued again after Christian tried asking Edge to get him for another title shot. After the tapings, a tribute for Edge aired and the two did a five-second pose in front of their hometown. In January 2012, it was announced that Edge would be inducted into the WWE Hall of Fame. On March 31, 2012, Christian inducted Edge into the WWE Hall of Fame. At the end of Edge's speech, he did a five-second pose to end the ceremony.

Last reunions (2014–2021)
Edge & Christian guest-hosted the December 29, 2014 episode of Raw. During the show, Christian was attacked and forced out of the ring by Seth Rollins, Big Show, & J&J Security. Edge was held to the mat by Big Show while Rollins threatened to break his neck with the Curb Stomp if John Cena did not bring back The Authority. Ultimately Cena would give in to Rollins' demands, saving Edge but bringing back The Authority. Edge & Christian appeared on the Stone Cold Podcast on the WWE Network following the September 7, 2015 episode of Raw.

Outside of WWE, the two have appeared together on the Syfy TV series Haven, on which Copeland had a strong recurring role as Dwight Hendrickson and Reso made guest appearances as McHugh, a close friend and ally of Dwight's. They are also now co-hosting The Edge & Christian Show That Totally Reeks of Awesomeness on the WWE Network. Their new show debuted on February 21, 2016, immediately following Fastlane. To promote the show, Edge & Christian hosted The Cutting Edge Peep Show at Fastlane featuring The New Day as their guests, a second season of the show was announced in April 2018. In addition, they started their own podcast called E&C's Pod of Awesomeness in April 2017.

In 2018, Edge & Christian inducted The Dudley Boyz (Bubba Ray Dudley & D-Von Dudley) into the WWE Hall of Fame.

After nine years and two neck surgeries, Edge made his in-ring return at the 2020 Royal Rumble, making it to the final three in the men's Royal Rumble match. He then reignited a feud with Randy Orton, which also saw involvement from Christian, as after Orton defeated Edge in a match at Backlash in June, which resulted in Edge suffering a legitimately torn triceps, Christian tried to take up for Edge, resulting in a quick unsanctioned match on Raw in June that Orton won.

At the 2021 Royal Rumble, Edge made his return from the torn triceps injury and entered the match at number one. Christian later entered the match at number 24 as a surprise entrant, marking his first official match since 2014, and he and Edge reunited. Christian was ultimately eliminated by Seth Rollins, but Edge then eliminated Rollins, and then Orton, to win the 2021 men's Royal Rumble match. Then, in March, Christian would leave WWE for AEW, thus separating the team once again.

Championships and accomplishments
Insane Championship Wrestling (Milwaukee)
ICW Streetfight Tag Team Championship (1 time)
Pro Wrestling Illustrated
Match of the Year (2000) vs. The Dudley Boyz and The Hardy Boyz in a triangle ladder match at WrestleMania 2000
Match of the Year (2001) vs. The Dudley Boyz and The Hardy Boyz in a Tables, Ladders and Chairs match at WrestleMania X-Seven
World Wrestling Federation/World Wrestling Entertainment/WWE
World Heavyweight Championship (2 times) - Edge
WWF Intercontinental Championship (2 times) – Edge
WWF Light Heavyweight Championship (1 time) – Christian
WWF Tag Team Championship (7 times)
King of the Ring (2001) – Edge
Wrestling Observer Newsletter
Tag Team of the Year (2000)

References

External links

Cagematch profile

WWE teams and stables
WWE World Tag Team Champions